White Princess of the Jungle is a jungle girl anthology comic book published quarterly by Avon Periodicals in the early 1950s.

Issue 1 presents the origin of the White Princess of the Jungle, Taanda.

The comic has been cited as an example of paternalistic white savior narratives, describing a story in which "'fierce fighters' who were 'such simple children' begged the forgiveness of white Princess Taanda for having been hoodwinked by an unscrupulous white man who paraded as their god and had them doing vile things."

Further reading
 Overstreet, Robert M.. Official Overstreet Comic Book Price Guide. House of Collectibles, 2004.

References

External links
 The Comic Book Database White Princess of the Jungle gallery featuring all five covers

Golden Age adventure heroes
Avon Periodicals titles
Jungle girls
1951 comics debuts
1952 comics endings
American comics
Adventure comics
Fictional American people
American comics characters
Comics about women